Eurypteryx geoffreyi is a moth of the  family Sphingidae. It is known from Thailand.

The length of the forewings is 31 mm for males and 38 mm for females. It is similar to Eurypteryx shelfordi but smaller. The abdominal anal tuft is black. The forewing upperside of the males has no discal spot and the forewing underside has no white preapical costal patch. The discal spot is yellowish. The hindwing underside is brown with a small yellowish discal spot. The marginal area is bounded by an indistinct submarginal line. The female differs from the male in the presence of a conspicuous discal spot on the forewing upperside formed from two partially fused white patches.

References

Eurypteryx
Moths described in 1990